Potocki Palace, is a large baroque palace in Warsaw located at Krakowskie Przedmieście Street 15, directly opposite the Presidential Palace. It was originally built for Denhoff family and succeeded by Potocki family in the end of 18th century.
After World War II the seat of the Ministry of Culture and Art (Ministerstwo Kultury i Sztuki). Nowadays - the Ministry of Culture and National Heritage (Ministerstwo Kultury i Dziedzictwa Narodowego).

History

The original building that stood where the palace now stands was burned down by Swedish and Brandenburgian forces during the Swedish Deluge in the 1650s. The new one was commissioned by Ernest Denhoff and construction started in 1693 under the architect Giovanni Pioli. From 1731 it belonged to August Aleksander Czartoryski.

Under the Czartoryski family, the palace underwent several renovations. In 1760 the building façade was refashioned and new alcove outbuildings and two wings facing the street were added, finished with storeyed pavilions with mansard roofs based on plans by Jakub Fontana. Between them a guard-house was erected (1763) with sculptures by Sebastian Zeisl and two gates on each side. The layout is shaped like a horseshoe, with a central part and two side wings. The building was set back from the street by a courtyard, protected by a wrought-iron fence with a gate. The fence was designed in the neorococo style by Leandro Marconi.

Pałac Potockich was torn down in 1944 by the Germans after the collapse of the Warsaw Uprising. It was rebuilt after the war in 1948-1950 according to a design by Jan Zachwatowicz.

See also

 Potocki Palace, Lviv
 Presidential Palace

References

General:

External links
 Potocki Palace
  www.warszawa1939.pl

Houses completed in 1766
Palaces in Warsaw
Rebuilt buildings and structures in Poland